Petrophile pedunculata, commonly known as conesticks, is a species of flowering plant in the family Proteaceae and is endemic to New South Wales.

Description

Taxonomy
Petrophile pedunculata was first formally described in 1810 by Robert Brown in the Transactions of the Linnean Society of London from material collected near Port Jackson.

Distribution and habitat
Petrophile pedunculata is found growing on shallow sandstone soils, often in open forest or heathlands. It is common along the coast of New South Wales between Port Jackson and Milton and on the ranges between the Blue Mountains and Marulan.

References

pedunculata
Flora of New South Wales
Plants described in 1810
Taxa named by Robert Brown (botanist, born 1773)